Alberta is an unincorporated community in L'Anse Township of Baraga County in the U.S. state of Michigan. Alberta is the site of the Ford Center, managed by the Michigan Technological University College of Forest Resources and Environmental Science.

The community was founded in 1936 after Henry Ford declared the banks of the Plumbago Creek to be an ideal spot for a sawmill. Ford named the town "Alberta" after the daughter of the superintendent of Ford's Upper Peninsula Operations at the time, which was either Fred J. Johnson or Edward G. Kingsford (for whom the town of Kingsford, Michigan and Kingsford charcoal is named). It was Ford's intention to have a model lumber and sawmill town, as well as to construct a plant in the southeastern forests of the Keweenaw.At the time Ford established Alberta, wood was used extensively in automobiles. The original village of Alberta consisted of twelve houses, two schools, and a steam-driven mill built to the most modern standards of the day. The Plumbago Creek was dammed to provide a reservoir to serve the town and mill's water supply needs. The mill was a two-story white clapboard wood-frame structure and still stands, now housing a portion of the Alberta Village Museum. This was a small capacity even by 1936 standards, with Ford's other three mills in the Upper Peninsula of Michigan producing twenty to twenty-five times as much. Those who resided in Alberta were expected to divide their time lumbering, milling, and farming.

Similarities exist between both the Ford-established and administered communities of Alberta and the town of Belterra, in the Brazilian state of Pará. It has been professionally noted that both towns were established by the Ford Motor Company around generally the same time. Both provided much-needed resources for the construction of the Model T, Alberta was a supplier of wood, and Belterra, a provider of rubber to the company.

Buildings still standing that were part of the original village on this property are now used as a museum, they also support research and serve as a hub for teaching programs for those with forestry and ecology majors, the buildings are also used by numerous universities from around the United States for forestry education.

References

External links 

 Alberta Village Museum
 Photos of Alberta

Unincorporated communities in Baraga County, Michigan
Company towns in Michigan
Populated places established in 1936
1936 establishments in Michigan
Unincorporated communities in Michigan